Khvajehim (also Romanized as Khvājehīm; also known as Adzhim-Kishlaki, ‘Ajīm Qeshlāgh, ‘Ajīm Qeshlāq, Ajim Qishlāqi, and Khajīm) is a village in Mehmandust Rural District, Kuraim District, Nir County, Ardabil Province, Iran. At the 2006 census, its population was 39, in 10 families.

References 

Tageo

Towns and villages in Nir County